The Interton Video 2800 is a dedicated first-generation home video game console that was released in 1977 by Interton. It could output only black and white. It is the successor of the Interton Video 2501 and the predecessor of the Interton Video 3000.

External links 

 Photos of the Interton Video 2800 and its packaging

References 

Dedicated consoles
First-generation video game consoles
Home video game consoles
1970s toys